Elachypteryx is a genus of moths of the family Crambidae.

Species
Elachypteryx callidryas (Turner, 1922)
Elachypteryx erebenna Turner, 1908

References

Musotiminae
Crambidae genera
Taxa named by Alfred Jefferis Turner